The highly diverse and distinctive music of Madagascar has been shaped by the musical traditions of Southeast Asia, Africa, Oceania, Arabia, England, France and the United States over time as indigenous people, immigrants, and colonists have made the island their home.

Malagasy music can be roughly divided into three categories: traditional, contemporary and popular music. Traditional musical styles vary by region and reflect local ethnographic history. Foreign instruments such as the acoustic guitar and piano have been adapted locally to create uniquely Malagasy forms of music. Many Western styles of popular music, including rock, gospel, jazz, reggae, hip-hop and folk rock, have also gained in popularity in Madagascar over the later half of the 20th century.

Music in Madagascar has served a variety of sacred and profane functions.  In addition to its performance for entertainment or personal creative expression, music has played a key part in spiritual ceremonies, cultural events and historic and contemporary political functions. By the late 19th century, certain instruments and types of music became primarily associated with specific castes or ethnic groups, although these divisions have always been fluid and are continually evolving.

Traditional music

Malagasy music is highly melodic and distinguishes itself from many traditions of mainland Africa by the predominance of chordophone relative to percussion instruments. Musical instruments and vocal styles found in Madagascar represent a blend of widespread commonalities and highly localized traditions. Music in Madagascar tends toward major keys and diatonic scales, although coastal music makes frequent use of minor keys, most likely due to early Arab influences at coastal ports of call. Malagasy music has served a wide range of social, spiritual and mundane functions across the centuries.

Vocal traditions 

Vocal traditions in Madagascar are most often polyharmonic; southern vocal styles bear strong resemblance to South African singing (as exemplified by groups such as Salala or Senge), whereas Highland harmonies, strongly influenced in the past two hundred years by European church music, are more reminiscent of Hawaiian or other Polynesian vocal traditions. In the Highlands, and particularly in the 19th century, vocal performance by large groups called  was favored, while in the south and western coastal regions singing was performed with more elaborate ornamentation and in small groups. Musical performance in Madagascar has often been associated with spiritual functions. The association between music and ancestors is so strong on the eastern coast that some musicians will put rum, cigarettes or other valued objects inside an instrument (through the tone hole, for instance) as an offering to the spirits to receive their blessings. Similarly, music has long been central to the  ceremony (periodic reburial of ancestors' shroud-wrapped mortal remains). 0

Musical instruments 

Instruments in Madagascar were brought to the island by successive waves of settlers from across the Old World. Over 1500 years ago, the earliest settlers from Indonesia brought the oldest and most emblematic instruments, including the tube zither which evolved into a box form distinct to the island.  Later settlers from the Arabian peninsula and the eastern coast of Africa contributed early lutes, whistles and other instruments that were incorporated into local musical traditions by the mid-16th century. The influence of instruments and musical styles from France and Great Britain began to have a significant impact on music in Madagascar by the 19th century.

Chordophones 
The  is considered the national instrument of Madagascar. It is typically tuned to a diatonic mode to produce complex music based on harmonic, parallel thirds accompanied by a melodic bass line. The strings are traditionally cut and raised from the fibrous surface of the bamboo tube itself, although a contemporary form also exists that instead uses bicycle brake cables for strings to give the instrument a punchier sound. 

Strings may be plucked with the fingernails, which are allowed to grow longer for this purpose.  The instrument was originally used for rituals and for creative artistic expression alike. However, beginning in the mid-19th century, playing the instrument became the prerogative of the Merina aristocracy to such an extent that possessing long fingernails became symbolic of nobility. While the tubular  is the most emblematic form of the instrument most likely due to its popularization by the 19th century Merina aristocracy, other forms of the instrument exist across the island.  In the region around the eastern port city of Toamasina, for instance,  used in  ceremonies may take a rectangular box form called . While some regions construct their  from wood, near Toamasina the box is constructed of metal sheeting with much thicker and heavier strings that produce a different sound from the bamboo and bicycle cable  of the Highlands.

The  (or ) is a four to six-stringed simple guitar common in the southern Highlands moving toward the east, particularly among the Betsimisaraka and Betsileo ethnic groups.

The  is a chordophone that traditionally has two sisal strings, three frets and a calabash resonator, although modern versions may have as many as eleven or thirteen strings, typically made of steel. A maximum of four of these are strung over the frets, while the rest are strung lengthwise down the sides of the neck and are strummed with the fingers in accompaniment to the primary melody which is played with a bow. This more elaborate  is especially popular among the Betsileo of the southern Highlands and the Betsimisaraka of the southeast, who play it in accompaniment to their sung epic poems, called . The , an evolved  with the sound box carved to resemble a three-stringed fiddle, is popular among the Southern Antandroy and Bara ethnic groups.

The piano was introduced to the royal Merina court in the early 19th century by envoys of the London Missionary Society, and soon afterward, local musicians began creating their own compositions for piano based on  technique.  Piano compositions reached their peak with the  style in the 1920s and 1930s before declining in the 1940s. Today, the compositions of this period by pianist theatrical composers like Andrianary Ratianarivo (1895–1949) and Naka Rabemananatsoa (1892–1952) form part of the canon of classical Malagasy music and feature in the repertoire of Malagasy students of piano.

When the modern acoustic guitar was first popularized in Madagascar, it was adopted by the lower classes who were inspired by the  piano style but for whom the purchase of a costly piano was out of reach. Soon afterward, the guitar was widely disseminated throughout the island, producing an explosion of regionally distinctive Malagasy guitar styles inspired by the music played on local traditional instruments. Finger picking is the favored technique and guitarists frequently experiment with original tunings to obtain the desired range. One of the most common tunings drops the sixth string from E to C and the fifth string from A to G, thereby enabling the guitarist to capture a range approximating that of a vocal choir.

Aerophones 
The , an end-blown flute, is believed to be one of the oldest instruments on the island. There exists the more common and well-known short , about a foot long with six finger holes and one for the thumb, and another similar end-blown flute over two feet long with three holes at the far end.  Both are open-ended and are played by blowing diagonally across the near opening. The master of  performance, Rakoto Frah, was featured on the 1000 Malagasy franc (200 ariary) banknote after independence in 1960 and his death on 29 September 2001 prompted national mourning.

The conch shell ( or ) is a similarly ancient instrument believed to have been brought over by early Indonesian settlers. Mainly played by men, it features a lateral blow hole in the Polynesian style and is typically reserved for ritual or spiritual uses rather than to create music for entertainment. The antsiva has also been recorded to have been used as part of Merina royal regalia. The fipple flute is a simple aerophone brought to Madagascar after 1000 CE by immigrants from Africa.

The two-octave diatonic accordion, popular across Madagascar, is believed to have been imported by French colonists after 1896. In the 20th century, the instrument was commonly performed during  spirit possession ceremonies in a style called . Artists like half-brothers Lego and Rossy have gained success as accordion players.

A variety of European aerophones were introduced in the 19th century under the Merina monarchy. These most notably include bugles and clarinets, and less frequently the trombone or oboe. Metal and wood harmonicas are also played.

Membranophones 

Various types of membranophones, traditionally associated with solemn occasions, are found throughout the island.

Idiophones 

During the slave trade era, another idiophone—a scraper called the —was popularized in Madagascar after being imported there from Brazil where it is known as a caracacha.

The earliest of these is played uniquely by a pair of women, one of whom sits with her legs outstretched together and the bars of the xylophone resting across her legs rather than on a separate resonator box. The xylophone bars range from five to seven in number and are made of differing lengths of a rot-resistant wood called . A similar xylophone called  is still played in the southwest among the Vezo and Bara ethnic groups.

Contemporary music 

Contemporary music comprises modern-day compositions that have their roots in  traditional musical styles and have been created for entertainment purposes, typically with the intent of eventual mass dissemination via cassette, compact disc, radio or internet. Modern forms of Malagasy music may incorporate such innovations as amplified or imported instruments (particularly electric guitar, bass guitar, synthesizer and drum kit), blend the sounds of new and traditional instruments or use traditional instruments in innovative ways. As contemporary artists adapt their musical heritage to today's market, they manage to preserve the melodic, chordophone-dominated sound that distinguishes traditional Malagasy music from the more percussion-heavy traditions of mainland Africa.
African genres like Coupé-décalé and Afrobeats 
heavily influence modern malagasy popular music.

Highlands 

In the 1950s and 1960s, a variety of bands in the Highlands (in the area between and around Antananarivo and Fianarantsoa) were performing covers of European and American hits or adapting mainland African tunes for local audiences. Madagascar got its first supergroup in the 1970s with Mahaleo, whose members blended traditional Malagasy sounds with soft rock to enormous and enduring success. His open and enthusiastic support for then-President Didier Ratsiraka assured his band regular performances in association with Presidential functions, and his band came to define the Ratsiraka epoch for many.

Coastal styles 

Distinct contemporary forms of music, rooted in local musical traditions, have emerged in the coastal regions since the 1960s.

is funky, energetic dance music dominated by ringing electric guitars, accordion (real or synthesized), and call-and-response polyphonic vocals, with heavy electric bass and a driving percussion. The percussion section might include a drum kit, djembe, and shakers.

 is an electrified version of the traditional  musical style that Tandroy singer Mama Sana used to perform at Betsimisaraka and Tsimihety rituals. 

The major exponents of modern  were Jaojoby and Mily Clément. Among the later artists are Ninie Doniah, Wawa, Vaiavy Chila, and Dr. J.B. and the Jaguars.

Like ,  is energetic dance music that originated from the traditional music of the southwestern region around Toliara and that has recently been adapted to contemporary instruments such as electric guitar, bass guitar and drum kit. While  had risen to national popularity by the mid-1980s (some would argue the 1970s),  only truly began to garner a similar level of widespread appreciation by the mid-1990s. It was not until the 2000 release of the "Tulear Never Sleeps" compilation album that the genre achieved international exposure on a major label. This compilation, however, showcases "traditional" , such as might have more commonly been performed in rural villages twenty years ago, rather than the amplified, synthesized and remixed style in heavy rotation on radio stations performed by national stars like Tearano, Terakaly, Jarifa, and Mamy Gotso.

Of note are Hazolahy (a largely acoustic roots band from the Southeast that plays ), D'Gary (an acclaimed acoustic guitarist from the inland South near Betroka), and Toto Mwandjani (who popularized Congolese ndombolo-style guitar, and whose band performs a fusion of Central/East African and Malagasy dance styles).

 Popular music 

A wide range of foreign music styles have been popularized in Madagascar, including French  performed by artists such as Poopy, reggae, gospel music, and pop rock performed by bands such as Green and AmbondronA. Since mid-2010s malagasy popular music has been a blend of malagasy music , tropical music (Zouk) and african genres like Coupé décalé and Afrobeats. Artists of this new wave of malagasy music include Black Nadia , Vaiavy Chila , LIANAH and BIG MJ. Jazz has been popularized by artists such as Nicolas Vatomanga. Malagasy hip hop broke into the mainstream in the mid-nineties and has since skyrocketed to popularity through artists such as Da Hopp and 18,3. More recently bands like Oladad are experimenting with the fusion of hip-hop and traditional Malagasy musical styles and instruments. There is also a small metal scene with bands like Sasamaso being the most prominent.Dancehall has gained popularity in Madagascar since late 2010s with artists like Mad Max and Basta Lion.

 Performance of Malagasy music 

Music has long served a variety of secular and sacred purposes in Madagascar. Song may accompany daily tasks, provide entertainment, preserve history or communicate social and political messages. Music is likewise integral to the experience of spiritual ritual among many ethnic and religious groups on the island.

 Secular performance 

Among some ethnic groups music would help advance a repetitive or arduous task. Geo Shaw, a missionary to Madagascar in the 19th century, described observing Betsileo and Merina serfs singing in the rice fields, "timing the music to the movements of their bodies, so that at each accented note they plant a stalk." Similarly, songs may accompany the paddling of dugout canoes on long journeys.

The preservation of oral history may be achieved through musical performance in Madagascar. The Betsileo  is performed by two men who each play a  while singing very loudly with a strained pitch in the soprano range. The structure of the song is complex and, unlike other Malagasy musical styles, parallel thirds are not predominant in the harmony. Other Southern ethnic groups also perform simplified variations of the  featuring for example a solo musician who strums rather than fiddles his accompanying instrument and sings at a lower, more natural pitch. While the Betsileo  can address diverse themes, those performed by other southern groups are almost always praise songs recalling a favorably memorable event.

Endogenous musical styles may also serve as a form of artistic expression, as in the highly syncopated  genre of Imerina. The  emerged in conjunction with the French introduction of operetta and the subsequent rise of Malagasy theater at the Theatre Municipale d'Isotry beginning in the late 1910s.

The  is a day-long spectacle of music, dance, and a stylized form of traditional oratory known as  performed by a troupe or as a competition between two or more troupes. Over time, these musicians formed independent troupes who used and continue to use the non-threatening performance format to explore sensitive social and political themes in the public arena.

The  troupes of today are remnants of a tradition of court musicians that persisted through the end of the 19th century. Under Queen Ranavalona III, the final monarch in the Merina dynasty, there were three official groups of state musicians: one for the queen, one for her prime minister, and another for the city of Antananarivo. The queen's troupe consisted of over 300 musicians. Each year at Christmas, the directors of each group would arrange a performance before the queen of a new original composition; the queen would select a winner among the three. The tradition of the court musician died out with the abolition of the monarchy in Madagascar after French colonization, but the  tradition has continued to thrive.

Musical styles from abroad have been merged with pre-existing Malagasy musical traditions to create distinctly Malagasy sounds with foreign roots. A specific form of partner dance accompanies this piece, in which dancers will form a long chain of male-female pairs with the woman at the front of each pair, both facing forward holding each other's hands while advancing to the rhythm of the music. From its origins as a courtly dance, the  today is a quintessentially Malagasy tradition performed at the beginning of a social event or concert to kick off the festivities.

 Sacred performance 

Music is a common element of spiritual ritual and ceremonies throughout the island.  For instance, members of  troupes are traditionally invited to perform at the  reburial ceremonies of central Madagascar. In coastal regions, music is crucial to helping a medium enter a trance state during a  ritual. While in a trance, the medium is possessed by an ancestral spirit. Each spirit is believed to prefer a particular tune or style of music and will not enter the medium unless the suitable piece of music is performed at the ceremony.

British missionaries of the London Missionary Society (LMS) arrived in Antananarivo in 1820 during the reign of King Radama I.  The subsequent spread of Christianity in Madagascar was coupled with the introduction of solfège as missionaries developed Malagasy-language hymns for their nascent church. The first wave of missionaries was obliged to depart Madagascar under Ranavalona I in 1836, but the hymns they developed became anthems for early Malagasy converts persecuted under the Queen's traditionalist policies.  In 1871, an LMS missionary (J. Richardson) improved the rhythm and harmony of these original hymns, which were considerably influenced by European musical styles such as quadrilles and waltzes.  Originally, church music was performed by slaves seated in groups of four to five at the front of the church. By the 1870s a more European congregational style had been adopted with all members of the church rising to their feet to sing together.

 See also 
 Andy Razaf, (1895–1973), US composer, lyricist & poet of Malagasy descent
 Taralila, a Malagasy style of concertina

 References 

 External links 

 Virtual visit: The Museum of Art and Archaeology of the University of Antananarivo (Madagascar). Image and sound gallery of Malagasy instruments. Retrieved 29 November 2010.
 Audio clips: Traditional Malagasy music performed at the Paris Exposition of 1931. National Library of France. Retrieved 29 November 2010.
 Audio clips: Traditional Malagasy music. Musée de l'Ethnographie de Génève.'' Accessed 29 November 2010. 
 Audio clip (60 minutes): "Valiha and the Music of the Spirit House." BBC Radio 3. Retrieved 29 November 2010.
 Audio clip (60 minutes): "Hira Gasy and Court Music." BBC Radio 3. Retrieved 29 November 2010.
 Audio clip (60 minutes): "Justin Vali." BBC Radio 3. Retrieved 29 November 2010.
 Audio clips: Contemporary Malagasy music. National Museum of African Art (Smithsonian Institution). Retrieved 29 November 2010.
 Database: Virtual Archive of Malagasy Music. Accessed 29 November 2010.
 MP3 Streaming: Free MP3 of Malagasy Music.
 Fandaharana Baobab: Radio Shows with Malagasy Music in RealAudio Stream

Malagasy music